The Wuxi Institute of Technology is a technological institute in the Chinese city of Wuxi.

Education in Wuxi
Schools in Jiangsu